Lesnoy or Lesnoi ("Forest") is a Russian masculine surname. Its feminine counterpart is Lesnaya. 

It may refer to:
Aleksandr Lesnoy (born 1988), Russian shot putter
Sergey Paramonov (entomologist) (1894–1967), Ukrainian-Australian entomologist who used the pseudonym Sergey Lesnoy
Vladyslava Lesnaya (born 1996), Ukrainian badminton player

Russian-language surnames